Anna Nielsen may refer to:

 Anna Nielsen (sport shooter)
 Anna Henriques-Nielsen (1881–1962), Danish stage and film actress
 Anna Nielsen (1803–1856), Danish stage actress and opera singer